The Northern Cape Classic was a golf tournament on the Sunshine Tour. It was played only in 2011 at the Kimberley Golf Club in Kimberley, Northern Cape, South Africa.

Winners

External links
Sunshine Tour's official site

Former Sunshine Tour events
Golf in South Africa
Kimberley, Northern Cape
2011 establishments in South Africa
2011 disestablishments in South Africa